Joanne Doonan (born 4 July 1994) is an Irish Gaelic footballer and Australian rules footballer first signing for the Carlton Football Club in the AFL Women's (AFLW). Doonan signed with Carlton as a rookie during the 2019 rookie signing period in September. She made her debut against  at Ikon Park in the opening round of the 2020 season.
She is currently playing at  after getting an early signing after a successful VFLW season at Essendon VFLW whereby they won the 2022 Premiership.

Gaelic football

Club 
At club level, Doonan has played for and captained both Kinawley and Queen's University. On 9 March 2018, she helped Queen's University win the O'Connor Shield final, scoring a goal and being named Player of the Match. On 26 October 2019, she captained Kinawley in the Ulster Intermediate Ladies' Football Championship final against St Paul's; this was her last Gaelic football match before leaving for Australia. In November 2019, she was named to the Gaelic Life Ulster Club All-Stars Ladies Team of the Year. Before moving back to Australia in 2022, Doonan captained her club Kinawley to an Ulster Intermediate Title for the first time in the clubs history and receiving anothe Gaelic Life Ulster Club All-Star.

Inter-county
Doonan has played for Fermanagh in two All-Ireland Junior Ladies' Football Championship finals. In 2017, she scored the winning goal as Fermanagh claimed the All-Ireland Junior title by beating Derry GAA after a replay. In 2019, she was selected as captain of the Fermanagh team. She helped her side achieve promotion and their first league title since 2007 with an NFL Division 4 final victory over Antrim in May, and lead them to another All-Ireland Junior final, which they lost to Louth in September.

Honours

Gaelic football  
 Fermanagh
All-Ireland Junior Ladies' Football Championship
Winners: 2017
Runner up: 2019
Winners: 2020
Ladies' National Football League Division 4
Winners: 2019
 Kinawley
Ulster Intermediate
Winners: 2021
 Queen's University
O'Connor Shield
Winners: 2018

References

External links 

1994 births
Living people
Carlton Football Club (AFLW) players
Irish female players of Australian rules football
Irish expatriate sportspeople in Australia
Queen's University Belfast Gaelic footballers
Alumni of Queen's University Belfast
Ladies' Gaelic footballers who switched code
Fermanagh Gaelic footballers